Martin Thomas Janzen (born May 31, 1973) is an American former professional baseball pitcher.

Playing career
Janzen played baseball at Gainesville High School in Gainesville, Florida but did not plan to play baseball after high school and was considering, instead, pursuing a career as a professional bowler. However, after graduating, Janzen spent a summer playing American Legion Baseball with coach Kevin Maris, the son of Roger Maris, and added  to his fastball. He signed with the New York Yankees as an amateur free agent on August 8, 1991.

Janzen was assigned to the Gulf Coast League to start his professional career. By 1994, he had reached the South Atlantic League with the Greensboro Bats and was described in the Greensboro News & Record as one of the "Yankees' prized pitching prospects."

During the 1995 season, Janzen was considered one of the best prospects in the Yankees' system and was the centerpiece of a trade deadline deal to the Toronto Blue Jays for reigning American League Cy Young Award winner David Cone. The trade has been retrospectively regarded one of the most lopsided trade deadline swaps in league history.

Janzen made his Major League debut with the Blue Jays on May 12 of the following season, pitching three scoreless innings in relief of Tony Castillo and picking up the win at the SkyDome against the Boston Red Sox. Janzen made the first start of his Major League career on May 27 against the Chicago White Sox. He allowed three runs over seven innings pitched. Janzen pitched 98.2 innings over 27 games in parts of the 1996 and 1997 seasons with the Blue Jays. He did not appear in the Major Leagues again after the 1997 season.

After the 1997 season, Janzen was selected by the Arizona Diamondbacks from the Blue Jays in the 1997 MLB expansion draft. Before the start of the 1998 season, he was traded by the Diamondbacks with Todd Erdos to the Yankees for Andy Fox. Between 1998 and 2004, Janzen played in five different countries for 18 different teams in the Korea Baseball Organization, Chinese Professional Baseball League, Mexican League, various independent leagues and in affiliated Minor League Baseball.

Coaching career
In 2008, Janzen coached a travel baseball team in Gainesville. In 2010, he was a pitching coach for the Southern Maryland Blue Crabs. From 2011–13, Janzen coached with the Lancaster Barnstormers. In 2015, he was hired as a pitching coach with the Long Island Ducks.

References

External links
, or Retrosheet

1973 births
Living people
American expatriate baseball players in Canada
American expatriate baseball players in Mexico
American expatriate baseball players in South Korea
American expatriate baseball players in Taiwan
Atlantic City Surf players
Baseball coaches from Florida
Baseball players from Florida
Camden Riversharks players
Cardenales de Lara players
American expatriate baseball players in Venezuela
Chattanooga Lookouts players
Columbus Clippers players
Greensboro Bats players
Greensboro Hornets players
Gulf Coast Yankees players
Indianapolis Indians players
KBO League pitchers
Kia Tigers players
Knoxville Smokies players
Major League Baseball pitchers
Mexican League baseball pitchers
Nashua Pride players
New Jersey Jackals players
Norwich Navigators players
People from Homestead, Florida
Piratas de Campeche players
Québec Capitales players
Salt Lake Stingers players
Sportspeople from Miami-Dade County, Florida
Syracuse Chiefs players
Syracuse SkyChiefs players
Tampa Yankees players
Tigres de Aragua players
Toronto Blue Jays players
Tucson Sidewinders players
Zion Pioneerzz players